This is a list of all military equipment ever used by Australia. This will include lists of all military equipment ever used by Australia in a certain category like ships and what military equipment Australia used at certain times like World War II.

Weapons 

 List of military weapons of Australia

Aircraft 

 List of aircraft of the Royal Australian Air Force

Ships 

 List of ships of the Royal Australian Navy

World War II 

 List of Australian military equipment of World War II

Modern day 

 List of equipment of the Australian Army
 List of current Royal Australian Air Force aircraft
 List of active Royal Australian Navy ships

References

Equipment
Au